An itaomacip (Japanese: イタオマチㇷ゚, Ainu: ita-oma-cip, "boat with a board") is a boat built traditionally by the Ainu for seafaring purposes. The name itaomacip is derived from the Ainu words ita-oma-cip, meaning literally a "boat with a board" (ita is a loan word from Japanese meaning "board"). It is a sewn boat enlarged via attaching side plates to a dugout canoe. When navigating inland waters, like rivers or lakes, Ainu typically utilized a cip, or plain dugout canoe, but used itaomacips whenever navigating the outer seas for trading purposes. Its construction techniques are unknown from other regions of Japan other than Hokkaido.

References 

Ainu culture
Canoes
Indigenous boats
Sailing ship types
Sailboat types